National Highway 2 (NR2) is a south–north flowing highway of central-western Burma.

The highway begins at Satthwadaw, to the north of Yangon at  where it is fed by  the National Highway 1 and then branches off to the northwest. At Myingyan it joins the National Road 18. The highway mostly follows the course of the Ayeyarwady River on its eastern bank.

Roads in Myanmar